Elspeth Henderson is former World Board Chairman of the World Association of Girl Guides and Girl Scouts (WAGGGS) and an educational consultant. She is Irish.

Educational career

Henderson is a former vice-principal and principal of Mount Temple Comprehensive School in Dublin. In 2006 she was an educational consultant. She was president of the Wesley College Alumni from 2011-2012.

Guiding and Scouting

Henderson has been involved with Guiding since childhood, as a Guide and a Ranger. As an adult, she has held numerous positions at both national and international levels. Between 1975 and 1989, she served the Irish Girl Guides as National Trainer, Chairman of the National Training Committee, Member of the National Executive Committee and International Commissioner. Henderson has also been President of the Irish Girl Guides.

Henderson was Chairman of the Europe Region of WAGGGS from 1989 - 1999. She was Chair of the Conference Planning Team for the 30th World Conference held in Dublin in 1999. She was awarded the WAGGGS Bronze medal in 1999. She was elected to the World Board in 2002 and between 2005 and 2008 she was the World Board Chairman. At the 33rd World Conference she was presented with the WAGGGS Silver Medal, WAGGGS' highest award.

See also

World Scout Committee

References

Year of birth missing (living people)
Mount Temple Comprehensive School
Living people
Chairs of the World Board (World Association of Girl Guides and Girl Scouts)
Scouting and Guiding in Ireland